The 2001–02 Allsvenskan season was the third season of the Allsvenskan, the second level of ice hockey in Sweden. 24 teams participated in the league, and Leksands IF, Bodens IK, Bofors IK, and IF Björklöven qualified for the Kvalserien.

Regular season

Northern Group

Southern Group

SuperAllsvenskan

Qualification round

Northern Group

Southern Group

Playoffs

First round 
 Mora IK - Skellefteå AIK 1:2 (4:1, 3:4 OT, 1:2)
 IFK Arboga IK - Bofors IK 1:2 (3:2 OT, 2:4, 2:5)
 IF Troja-Ljungby - Tingsryds AIF 2:0 (4:2, 4:3)
 Hammarby IF - IF Björklöven 0:2 (5:6 OT, 4:5)

Second round 
 IF Troja-Ljungby - Bofors IK 1:2 (2:1 OT, 1:3, 2:3 OT)
 Skellefteå AIK - IF Björklöven 1:2 (5:3, 1:5, 3:4 OT)

Relegation round

Northern Group

Southern Group

Kvalserien

External links 
 Season on passionhockey.com

Swe
HockeyAllsvenskan seasons
2